Aaron Katebe (born 24 January 1992) is a Zambian footballer who most recently played for Real Kashmir in the I-League as a defender.

Club career
Born in Chililabombwe, near the Congolese border, Katebe began his career with Afrisports FC. As a youth player he was groomed by the Afrisports coaches who had previously had success with youth players such as Stoppila Sunzu and Rainford Kalaba. He soon found his way into Coach Honour Janza's 2010 COSAFA U-20 side. Zambia won the 2010 COSAFA U-20 Cup, and he soon caught the eye of scouts throughout Southern Africa.

In 2010, Katebe was transferred to Konkola Blades FC from Afrisports. After another good season, he saw himself become an international transfer, moving to Hwange of Zimbabwe. At Hwange, Katebe became a regular starter playing center-back and defensive midfield. During the league campaign he scored several decision making goals.

At the end of 2012, Katebe was coveted by teams in South Africa as well as teams in Zimbabwe and Zambia. A tussle broke out between Dynamos FC and Platinum FC (both of Zambia), but in the end Platinum were able to secure his signature.

In August 2013, he had trials with Danish 1st Division side Vendsyssel FF, and played with their 2nd team Hjørring IF. He returned to Platinum FC after the trial and has continued featuring for Platinum FC where he helped them to a 4th-place finish in the 2013 season. He continued the 2014 Season with FC Platinum.

In August 2015, Katebe signed for the Moroccan club Moghreb Tetouan after a fierce competition with WAC Casablanca, another Moroccan club. From 2018 to 2020, he played for Indian I-League club Real Kashmir under coaching of David Robertson.

International career
Katebe was a member of the Zambian U-17 team that participated in a 4-Nation invitational U-17 Tournament in the UAE. The team placed 3rd, taking home a bronze medal. He then participated in the COSAFA U-20 Tournament the following year, winning the Championship.

Katebe earned his first full cap for Zambia in a goalless draw against Angola in a friendly match on 16 May 2012 in Luanda. Katebe played the entire 90 minutes in defence, playing first as a center back and then moving into the defensive midfield position. Katebe subsequently has featured for the Zambian national team in matches against Malawi, South Korea and Zimbabwe and Saudi Arabia.

He has been called up several times for the Zambian National Team and has featured in friendly matches, the 2015 COSAFA Cup (where he scored 2 goals), and several African Nations Cup qualifiers.

Honors
 Bronze Medal, Abu Dhabi 4-Nation Invitational, UAE, 2009
 Champions, 2010 COSAFA U-20 Cup, Botswana

National team
Zambian U-17 Team
2009 Abu Dhabi 4-Nation Invitational, UAE

Zambia U-20 Team
2010 COSAFA U-20 Cup

Zambia National Team (Incomplete List)
 Angola vs. Zambia – 16 May 2012  – FRIENDLY
 Zambia vs. Malawi – 16 July 2012  – FRIENDLY
 Zambia vs. Zimbabwe – 8 August 2012  – FRIENDLY
 South Korea vs. Zambia – 15 August 2012 –  FRIENDLY
 Saudi Arabia vs. Zambia – 5 December 2012  – FRIENDLY
 Lesotho vs. Zambia – 24 March 2013 – WORLD CUP QUALIFIER, UNUSED SUB

 Zambia vs. Ivory Coast – 25 October 2014  – FRIENDLY

 Mozambique vs. Zambia – 15 November 2014  – AFRICAN NATIONS CUP QUALIFIER, UNUSED SUB

 2015 COSAFA Cup - 17–30 May 2015 - COSAFA CUP

 Zambia vs. Guinea-Bissau - 13 June 2015 – AFRICAN NATIONS CUP QUALIFIER

References

External links
First National Team call up
Katebe is Doing Well-Renard
Angolan vs. Zambia friendly match report
Renard hails promising Katebe
Zambia FA article on Aaron Katebe
Katebe scores for Hwange
Aaron Katebe's Profile
Aaron Katebe Video – South Korea vs. Zambia

1992 births
Living people
Zambian footballers
Zambia youth international footballers
Zambia international footballers
Association football defenders
Konkola Blades F.C. players
Hwange Colliery F.C. players
F.C. Platinum players
Moghreb Tétouan players
Zanaco F.C. players
Nkana F.C. players
Real Kashmir FC players
Zambian expatriate footballers
Expatriate footballers in Zimbabwe
Zambian expatriate sportspeople in Zimbabwe
Expatriate footballers in Morocco
Zambian expatriate sportspeople in Morocco
Expatriate footballers in India
Zambian expatriate sportspeople in India
I-League players